Igor Hernández Colina (born 22 January 1977) is a Venezuelan beach volleyball player. He played with Jesus Villafañe at the 2012 Summer Olympics.

References

External links
 
 
 
 

1977 births
Living people
Venezuelan beach volleyball players
Men's beach volleyball players
Beach volleyball players at the 2012 Summer Olympics
Olympic beach volleyball players of Venezuela
Beach volleyball players at the 2007 Pan American Games
Beach volleyball players at the 2011 Pan American Games
Pan American Games medalists in volleyball
Pan American Games silver medalists for Venezuela
Medalists at the 2011 Pan American Games
People from Cojedes (state)
21st-century Venezuelan people